The Iranian ambassador in Tokyo is the official representative of the Government in Tehran to the Government of Japan. 

Till August 16, 1971 the Iranian Ambassador to Japan was accredited in Taipei.

List of representatives

See also
Iran–Japan relations

References 

 
Japan
Iran